The 1935 Centenary 300 was a motor race staged at the Phillip Island circuit in Victoria, Australia on 1 January 1935. 
It was contested over 46 laps of the 6.569 mile course, a total distance of 302.174 miles.
At the time, it was claimed to be the longest race of the kind ever held in Australia.	
The race, which was conducted on a handicap basis, was limited to cars with a piston displacement of not more than 2500cc.	
The race meeting was organised by the Light Car Club of Australia and was held under licence from the Australian Automobile Association and in accordance with the International Sporting Code governing car racing.

The race was won by Les Murphy driving an MG P.

Results

Notes
 Entries: 28
 Starters: 21
 Non-starters: 7
 Finishers (within five hour time limit): 4
 Flagged Off (exceeded five hour time limit): 4
 Attendance: 20,000
 Fastest time: W Williamson, 4h 8m 56s
 Fastest lap: Bill Thompson, MG Magnette, 4:48.6

The car driven by Campbell Graham crashed on the 34th lap of the race. Both Graham and his riding mechanic John Peters died as a result of their injuries.

Notes & references

Centenary 300
Motorsport at Phillip Island